Ayşegül Behlivan is a Turkish female Muay Thai and wushu practitioner.

Achievements
Muay Thai
 (51 kg) 2008 World Muay Thai Championships - September 26-October 2, 2008, Busan, South Korea
 (51 kg) 2009 National Muay Thai Championships - April 15–19, 2009, Antalya, Turkey
 (51 kg) 2009 European Muay Thai Championships -  May 15–22, 2009, Liepāja, Latvia

Wushu
 (52 kg) 2008 National Wushu Championships - July 17–20, 2008, Ordu, Turkey
 (52 kg) 2009 National Wushu Championships - July 24–26, 2009, Safranbolu, Turkey
 (52 kg) 2004 National Wushu Championships-TRABZON-TURKEY
 (52 kg) 10th World Wushu Championships -  October 25–29, 2009, Toronto, Ontario, Canada
 (52 kg) 1st World Combat Games - August 26-September 4, 2010, Beijing, China
 (52 kg) 5th Sanda World Cup -  December 16–18, 2010, Chongqing, China

2011 MUAY THAİ EUROPEAN CUP- LATVİA 54 KG.GOLD MEDAL..
2010 5TH WUSHU WORLD CUP (CHINA/Çongçing)..
2010 COMBAT GAMES WU SHU 2.(CHINA7BEİJİNG)..
2009 MUAY THAİ EUROPEAN CHAMPİONSHİP 2.(LATVİA)..
2009 WORLD WUSHU CHAMPİONSHİP 52 KG 3.(CANADA/TORONTO)..
2009 AKA KİCK BOKS EUROPEAN CHAMPİONSHİP 1.(ENGLAND)..
2008 AKA EUROPEAN CHAMPİON (ENGLAND/LONDON)..
2008 WORLD MUAY THAİ CHAMPİONSHİP 51 KG. 3.(G.KORE/BUSAN)..
2008 OPEN US MUAY THAİ 2.(AMERİCA/FL.MİAMİ)..
2008 MUAY THAİ PROF. 1.(SURİYE)..
2007 MUAY THAİ 1.(AMERİCA/CHİCAGO)..
2007 AKA AVRUPA 2.(ENGLAND)..
2007 IMC MUAY THAİ PROFİ 2.(GREECE)..
2004 MUAY THAİ KİNGS CUP. (THAİLAND/BANGKOK)..
2010-2009-2008-2006-2005-2004 WUSHU NATİONAL CHAMPİON..
2009-2008-2006-2005-2003 MUAY THAİ NATİONAL CHAMPİON..

References

Sportspeople from Mersin
Living people
Turkish Muay Thai practitioners
Turkish sanshou practitioners
Turkish female martial artists
1989 births
Female Muay Thai practitioners
21st-century Turkish women